Irma Carrillo Ramirez (born 1964) is a United States magistrate judge of the United States District Court for the Northern District of Texas and is a former nominee to be a United States district judge of the United States District Court for the Northern District of Texas.

Biography

Ramirez was born in 1964. She received a Bachelor of Arts degree in 1986 from the West Texas A&M University. She received a Juris Doctor in 1991 from the Southern Methodist University Dedman School of Law. Ramirez began her legal career working as an associate for the law firm Locke Purnell Rain Harrell, PC (now Locke Lord LLP) from 1991 to 1995. She served as an Assistant United States Attorney for the United States Attorney's Office for the Northern District of Texas, working in the Civil Division from 1995 to 1999 and the Criminal Division from 1999 to 2002.
She was sworn in United States magistrate judge for the United States District Court for the Northern District of Texas on September 9, 2002.

Expired nomination to district court

On March 15, 2016, President Obama nominated Ramirez to serve as a United States District Judge of the United States District Court for the Northern District of Texas, to the seat vacated by Judge Terry R. Means, who took senior status on July 3, 2013. On September 7, 2016 a hearing before the Senate Judiciary Committee was held on  her nomination. Her nomination expired on January 3, 2017, with the end of the 114th Congress.

References

1964 births
Living people
20th-century American lawyers
20th-century American women lawyers
21st-century American judges
21st-century American lawyers
21st-century American women lawyers
21st-century American women judges
American judges of Mexican descent
American lawyers of Mexican descent
Assistant United States Attorneys
Dedman School of Law alumni
Hispanic and Latino American judges
People from Brownfield, Texas
United States magistrate judges
West Texas A&M University alumni